Balesin (also Romanized as Bālesīn and Bālsīn; also known as Balin) is a village in Tirchai Rural District, Kandovan District, Meyaneh County, East Azerbaijan Province, Iran. At the 2006 census, its population was 1,323, in 328 families.

References 

Populated places in Meyaneh County